Reginald Le Borg (11 December 1902 – 25 March 1989) was an Austrian film director. He was born in Vienna, Austria with the surname Groebel and directed 68 films between 1936 and 1974.

Le Borg made a series of low-budget horror films at Universal Studios in the 1940s. In 1944, he made his most expensive and also most successful film, San Diego, I Love You, featuring Buster Keaton in a supporting role.

A banker in Vienna, he came to the United States as a visitor in 1928, 1929 and 1930, according to New York steamship passenger manifests. He was recorded as Harry Reginald Groebel. He emigrated permanently in 1931. In his naturalization petition in 1937, he changed his name legally from Harry Groebel to Reginald Le Borg Le Borg died in Los Angeles, California from a heart attack.

Selected filmography

 Calling Dr. Death (1943)
 Heavenly Music (1943 - writer)
 Adventure in Music (1944)
 Dead Man's Eyes (1944)
 San Diego, I Love You (1944)
 Destiny (1944)
 Jungle Woman (1944)
 The Mummy's Ghost (1944)
 Weird Woman (1944)
 Joe Palooka, Champ (1946)
 Little Iodine (1946)
 Susie Steps Out (1946)
 Fall Guy (1947)
 Philo Vance's Secret Mission (1947)
 Joe Palooka in the Knockout (1947)
 Joe Palooka in Fighting Mad (1948)
 Joe Palooka in Winner Take All (1948)
 Trouble Makers (1948)
 Fighting Fools (1949)
 Hold That Baby! (1949)
 Joe Palooka in the Counterpunch (1949)
 Young Daniel Boone (1950)
 Joe Palooka in the Squared Circle (1950)
 Joe Palooka in Triple Cross (1951)
 That Kind of Girl (1952)
 The Flanagan Boy (aka Bad Blonde) (1953)
 The Great Jesse James Raid (1953)
 Sins of Jezebel (1953)
 The Black Sleep (1956)
 Voodoo Island (1957)
 War Drums (1957)
 The Dalton Girls (1957)
 The Flight that Disappeared (1961)
 Deadly Duo (1962)
 Diary of a Madman (1963)
 The Eyes of Annie Jones (1964)

Further reading
 Helmut G. Asper: Etwas besseres als den Tod – Filmexil in Hollywood. Schüren Verlag, Marburg 2002, p. 154–168 (German)
 Helmut G. Asper: Filmexilanten im Universal Studio. Bertz und Fischer, 2005, (German)
 Wheeler Winston Dixon: The Films of Reginald Le Borg. Scarecrow Press (Filmmakers series Book 31), 1992

References

External links

1902 births
1989 deaths
Austrian film directors
Horror film directors